Apion pisi is a species of seed weevils native to Europe. It is phytophagous and a pest of lucerne

References

External links
Images representing Apion at BOLD

Brentidae
Beetles described in 1801
Beetles of Europe